Mount Chishi is a mountain located in Duruan Town, Xinhui District of Jiangmen, Guangdong, China, with a height of  above sea level.

Name
The name of Mount Chishi is cited from the Chinese idiom "", meaning mysterious things. It was named by the Great Minister of War of Ming dynasty (1368-1644) Huang Gongfu when he climbed the mountain.

Attractions
 Yangshikeng: Edmund Ho, presented 38 stone statues of goat to the local government.
 Guanyin Cliff: A cliff is engraved with Guanyin.
 Guanyin Temple: A Buddhist temple first built in the Qianlong period (1736-1795) of Qing dynasty (1644-1912).
 Hall of Magnolia liliflora: A hall with a 1000-year-old Magnolia liliflora.
 Duquan Pavilion: A pavilion located under the waterfall and built by Zheng Ji (1813–1874), a native calligrapher and painter.
 Pavilion of the Prince: A pavilion built to commemorate the loyal ministers of the Southern Ming dynasty (1644-1683).

Gallery

References

Geography of Jiangmen
Tourist attractions in Jiangmen
Chishi